Amirabad-e Kot Gorg (also Romanized as Amīrābād-e Kot Gorg; also known as Kot-e Gorg Ābī Sanjarī, Kot Gorg, Kotūgorg Ābī Sanjarī, Kūt Gorg, and Kūtgurg) is a village in Mohammadabad Rural District, in the Central District of Anbarabad County, Kerman Province, Iran. At the 2006 census, its population was 375, in 63 families.

References 

Populated places in Anbarabad County